Rediul Mare is a village in Dondușeni District, Moldova.

Notable people
 Mihail Dolgan

References

Villages of Dondușeni District